The 1970 Detroit Lions season was the 41st season in franchise history. With a record of 10–4, the Lions finished in second place in the NFC Central and qualified for the playoffs for the first time since their championship season in 1957 (the Lions played in three post-season, runner-up bowl games in 1960, 1961, and 1962 and won all three). The Lions fell 5–0 to the Dallas Cowboys in the lowest scoring game in NFL playoff history. One unusual loss during the regular season was to the New Orleans Saints on Week 8. The Lions had a 17–16 lead with only 2 seconds left, but Saints kicker Tom Dempsey booted a then-record 63-yard field goal as time expired to give the Saints a 19–17 win.

NFL Draft

Roster

Regular season

Schedule 

Note: Intra-division opponents are in bold text.

Season summary

Week 3

Standings

Playoffs

References 

 Detroit Lions on Pro Football Reference
 Detroit Lions on jt-sw.com
 Detroit Lions on The Football Database

Detroit Lions
Detroit Lions seasons
Detroit Lions